Patriarch Metrophanes of Constantinople may refer to:

Patriarch Metrophanes II of Constantinople, reigned from 1440 to 1443
Patriarch Metrophanes III of Constantinople, reigned from 1565 to 1572 and from 1579 to 1580